The Kildare Senior Football Championship is an annual Gaelic football competition organised by Kildare GAA between the top clubs in County Kildare, Ireland. The winners of the Championship qualify to represent their county in the Leinster Club Championship, the winners of which progress to the All-Ireland Senior Club Football Championship. The current (2022) champions are Naas. The most successful club in Kildare is Sarsfields.

Wins listed by club

Notes:
Sarsfields includes 9 titles won under the Roseberry name.
Round Towers includes 1 title won under the Kildare St. Patrick's name.
Ellistown includes 2 titles won under the Mountrice Blunts name.

Finals listed by year

 For those with an * beside the year see below:
 1921 - Won on an objection
 1910 - Replayed after disputed point in first game
 1908 - According to Eoghan Corry's Kildare GAA A Centenary History, Clane were runners up but others regard Allen as runners up
 1890 - Replayed after objection

References

External links
KildareGAA365 List of Senior Finals and Winning Captains 
Official Kildare Website
Kildare on Hoganstand
Kildare Club GAA

 
1
Senior Gaelic football county championships